United Sikkim Football Club  is an Indian professional football club based in Gangtok, Sikkim. Founded in 2011, the club usually competed in the Sikkim Premier Division League. United Sikkim is the only club from Sikkim to have played in the I-League, one of the top flights of Indian football league system. The club which is owned by former India captain Bhaichung Bhutia, was founded in order to give people of the Indian state of Sikkim a professional football team.

In September 2019, Bhaichung Bhutia announced shutting the club down due to some unavoidable circumstances. During an emotional farewell event, Bhaichung Bhutia thanked all the players and support staff besides the fans who supported the club over the years.

The club was revived again in January 2021, with aim to play in the Indian Super League. Manager Arjun Rai said on Monday that besides inaugurating the senior and youth team, emphasis would be laid on bringing footballers from the villages.

History

Foundation
The professional club was founded in 2011, by Sikkim Football Association (SFA) and Baichung Bhutia, already competing in the Sikkim Gold Cup and other all-India tournaments for the early years of their existence. Then on 22 March 2011, the club was launched as a professional, which would be co-owned by Dubai-based Fidelis World, former India football captain Bhaichung Bhutia and Indian singer Shankar Mahadevan. The club revealed that they would compete in the 2011 I-League 2nd Division, in the quest for promotion to the I-League within the next three years.

2011–2012: 2nd Division seasons
The club started their quest for the I-League on 27 February 2011, when they signed Liberian international Johnny Menyongar from NSC Minnesota Stars of the North American Soccer League in the United States. The club played their first match of the 2011 I-League 2nd Division against Langsning F.C. on 31 March 2012, in which they drew 2–2. United Sikkim won their first match of the season five days later, on 5 April 2011 against North Imphal Sporting Association at the Indira Gandhi Athletic Stadium in Assam, by a score of 2–0. The club finished in first place in group A of the first round of the I-League 2nd Division and thus qualified for the 2011 I-League 2nd Division Final Round, in which they only needed to finish in the top two for promotion. The club began Final round with three consecutive draws against Sporting Clube de Goa, Royal Wahingdoh and Shillong Lajong, before winning two matches in a row against Mohammedan and Southern Samity. Next, a draw to Ar-Hima and a loss to Vasco officially knocked United Sikkim out of contention for promotion and forced them to settle on fifth place for the season.

The season including the 2012 I-League 2nd Division did not start well for United Sikkim. On 11 June 2011, it was announced that Johnny Menyongar would leave the club to join I-League team Shillong Lajong, as well as Indian internationals Renedy Singh and NS Manju few months later. However, after firing coach Stanley Rozario, United Sikkim signed Belgian Philippe De Ridder as coach of the team. The club re-signed Nigerian players Daniel Bedemi and Quinton Jacobs for the season. They then began charge for the I-League for the second season in a row with a 3–2 victory over Bhawanipore F.C. at the Satindra Mohan Dev Stadium in Assam on 2 February 2012. The club went on to win three more matches during the first round of the I-League 2nd Division against Eagles, Southern Samity and Ar-Hima in order to qualify for the final round. They won promotion on the last day of the season on 17 April 2012 at the Paljor Stadium in front of 30,000 fans, as United Sikkim drew Mohammedan 1–1, with Daniel Bedemi scoring.

On 13 November 2012, Bhutia was named the interim manager to replace Belgian Philippe De Ridder, after the club's heavy 1–10 defeat in an I-League match against Prayag United on 10 November 2012 at the Salt Lake Stadium.

2012–2013: I-League
Later it was initially reported that United Sikkim had started talks with Australian manager Nathan Hall about a possible head coaching role at the club. On 10 December 2012, it was officially confirmed by United Sikkim that Hall had joined the club as its new head coach, replacing interim player-coach Bhaichung Bhutia. His first game as head coach of the club in the league came on 15 December against Mumbai at the Balewadi Sports Complex in which United Sikkim lost 0–1. Hall then managed to earn his first point as head coach in his next match against ONGC on 29 December in which his side drew 1–1 at the Ambedkar Stadium with Nadong Bhutia scoring the first goal for United Sikkim under Hall.

United Sikkim did not win a single game under Hall until 27 March 2013 in which his side managed a 5–0 victory over forced-relegated side Air India at the Paljor Stadium. This would turn out to be United Sikkim's last win and points for the rest of the season as the side lost its last four matches after this one and were thus relegated to the I-League 2nd Division.

2013: Travel to Bhutan
In March 2013, United Sikkim went to Bhutan for training. In their first foreign tour, they played three friendly matches against local sides Drukpol, Yeedzin and Zimdra at the Changlimithang Stadium in Thimpu.

From July to August, they went to Bhutan again and participated in 2013 King's Cup, in which they moved to the knockout stages. In the first semi-final, United Sikkim lost 2–4 to Manang Marshyangdi of Nepal.

2014: I-League 2nd Division
They also participated in the 2014 I-League 2nd Division and moved to the Final Round of I-League Qualifiers, finishing on fourth position with seven points in eight matches.

2014–2018
On 18 December 2014, it was revealed by owner Bhaichung Bhutia that United Sikkim had decided to leave the competition as future of I League was dim due to the formation of ISL, and thus team would only participate in the local league.

In February 2018, United Sikkim went to Nepal for participating in the 16th Aaha! Rara Gold Cup, in which they failed to reach the knock-out stages.

2020–present
The All India Football Federation was all set to invite bids for vacant spot in the I-League and Gangtok-based United Sikkim Football Club were one of the front-runners to submit it for 2020–21 season. However, the bid was won by Sudeva Moonlight (currently Sudeva Delhi) from Delhi.

In 2021, Bhaichung Bhutia, the owner of the club announced that it will revive its junior and senior teams while aiming to bring the Indian Super League (ISL) into the state. The Sikkim's top club said it will also focus on its grassroots programme.

Crest and colours
On 22 March 2011, the first kit and crest of United Sikkim were unveiled at Taj Hotel in Kolkata. The club crest had a picture of a Snow lion, which is also their mascot, and the color of the kit was red with white shorts. The club's away colors are dark and light blue. On 29 August 2012, after gaining promotion to the I-League, the club unveiled their new crest which is dominantly red, unlike orange crests from before. Instead of having "est. 2008" for the founding year, new crest has "est. 2011", which stands for the year when professionalized itself.

Stadium

For their first season in the I-League, the club announced that they would play all their home matches at the 30,000 seater Paljor Stadium in the capital of Sikkim, Gangtok. When the club was participating in amateur tournaments from 2008 to 2011, and the I-League 2nd Division from 2011 to 2012, in which they would play in neutral venues, the club used Paljor Stadium as a training ground, holding majority of their practices there.

However, despite the I-League 2nd Division being a neutral competition, the Paljor Stadium was given the rights to host the 2012 I-League 2nd Division Final Round 2nd leg, in which United Sikkim was also participating. The ground was also the venue for the match in which United Sikkim gained promotion to the I-League after drawing with Mohammedan (1–1).

Rivalry
United Sikkim had a rivalry with their fellow North East Indian club Shillong Lajong FC in the I-League, which was often regarded as the "Northeast India Derby".

Northeast India Derby

Sikkim Derby
United Sikkim has also a rivalry with their fellow Sikkim-based club Gangtok Himalayan SC, whom they face in regional tournaments including Sikkim Premier Division League. Both the clubs use Paljor Stadium as their home grounds. They last met each other on 9 November 2019 during a match of Sikkim Governor's Gold Cup and Gangtok Himalayan defeated United by 3–1 margin.

Kit manufacturers and shirt sponsors

Managerial history

Notable players
For all former notable players of United Sikkim with a Wikipedia article, see: United Sikkim F.C. players.

World Cup player
  Michael Rodríguez (2012–2013)

Honours & achievements

Domestic
 I-League 2nd Division
Champions (1): 2012
 Sikkim Premier Division League
Champions (3): 2013, 2017, 2018
Runners-up (1): 2014

International
 Jigme Dorji Wangchuk Memorial Gold Cup
Semi-finals: 2013

Regional
Bordoloi Trophy
Semi-finals (1): 2016
Darjeeling Gold Cup
Runners-up (1): 2011

See also

 List of football clubs in India

References

External links
United Sikkim FC at Soccerway

United Sikkim FC at Khel Now
United Sikkim FC at Global Sports Archive
 United Sikkim FC at Weltfussballarchiv
United Sikkim FC at Nepal90

Football clubs in Sikkim
Association football clubs established in 2011
I-League clubs
I-League 2nd Division clubs
2011 establishments in Sikkim
Sikkim Premier Division League